The Voyage 11.2, or Voyage 11.20, is a French sailboat that was designed by Guy Ribadeau Dumas as a cruiser and first built in 1988.

Production
The design was built by Jeanneau in France, starting in 1988, but it is now out of production.

Design
The Voyage 11.2 is a recreational keelboat, built predominantly of fiberglass, with wood trim and a masthead sloop rig. The hull has a raked stem, a reverse transom with steps to a swim platform, a skeg-mounted rudder controlled by a wheel and a fixed fin keel. It displaces .

The boat is fitted with a Japanese Yanmar 4GH2E diesel engine for docking and maneuvering.

The design has sleeping accommodation for six people, with a double "V"-berth in the bow cabin and two aft cabins, each with a double berth. The galley is located on the starboard side, amidships and opposite the "U" shaped settee around the oval table. The galley is equipped with a three-burner stove, an ice box and a double sink. A navigation station is on the starboard side, aft of the galley. The head is located just forward of the aft port cabin. Each cabin also has its own sink.

See also
List of sailing boat types

References

External links

Photo of a Voyage 11.2 showing the transom
Photo of a Voyage 11.2 showing beam view

Keelboats
1980s sailboat type designs
Sailing yachts
Sailboat type designs by Guy Ribadeau Dumas
Sailboat types built by Jeanneau